is a Japanese former handball player who competed in the 1984 Summer Olympics and in the 1988 Summer Olympics.

References

1959 births
Living people
Japanese male handball players
Olympic handball players of Japan
Handball players at the 1984 Summer Olympics
Handball players at the 1988 Summer Olympics
Asian Games medalists in handball
Handball players at the 1982 Asian Games
Handball players at the 1986 Asian Games
Asian Games silver medalists for Japan
Asian Games bronze medalists for Japan
Medalists at the 1982 Asian Games
Medalists at the 1986 Asian Games
20th-century Japanese people